Yvvette Edwards FRSL is a British novelist born in London, England, of Caribbean heritage. Her first novel, A Cupboard Full of Coats, was published in 2011 to much acclaim and prize nominations that included the Man Booker Prize longlist and the Commonwealth Book Prize shortlist. Edwards followed this debut work five years later with The Mother (2016), a novel that "reinforces her accomplishment". She is a contributor to the 2019 anthology New Daughters of Africa, edited by Margaret Busby.

Biography

Of Caribbean parentage, Yvvette Edwards was born in Barnet and was brought up by her mother, who had migrated to Britain as a child from Montserrat. Edwards attended school in Hackney, east London, where she still lives with her family.

Her first novel, A Cupboard Full of Coats, was published in 2011 by Oneworld Publications and received many accolades, among them being named a Kirkus Reviews "2011 Best of Fiction" choice, being longlisted for the 2011 Booker Prize, shortlisted for the Writers' Guild Awards 2011, shortlisted for the Waverton Good Read Award 2011, shortlisted for the Commonwealth Book Prize in 2012, nominated for the 44th NAACP Image Awards in January 2013, nominated for the International Dublin Literary Award 2013, and nominated for the Hurston-Wright Legacy Award 2013. It was described by Kirkus Reviews as "An impressive debut, particularly notable for its pellucid prose." Jonathan Barnes wrote of it in The Literary Review: "Rich in emotion but resolutely unsentimental, the story is unspooled with judgement and skill. Information is released at an almost ideal pace and secrets are withheld until the last possible moment. Edwards’s clear, colloquial prose is full of quietly impressive phrase-making. ... The performance is a wholly satisfying one and the novel’s valedictory suggestions of redemption feel earned, solid and real."

Edwards' second book, The Mother, published in 2016, received a nomination in the 48th NAACP Image Awards in the category "Outstanding Literary Work – Fiction", and was also a nominee for the Hurston-Wright Legacy Award in 2017. Highly recommending the novel, which "delves into the timely issue of violence against and between young black men—both its possible causes, and its heartrending effects on the families involved", BookPage stated that "Edwards perceptively explores a wide realm of issues ... with compassion for her characters and with intuitive understanding of the effects of loss on a family". Paste magazine described it as "a powerful work that illuminates the web of ramifications spun from a personal tragedy", and NBC News commented on the author's "masterful storytelling". The New York Journal of Books described it as "a clear-eyed, unsentimental novel about modern city life and the challenges parents face", and concluded: "The Mother is another hit-the-ball-out-of-the-park novel by a writer to watch. Yvvette Edwards should be proud of her work."

Her short story "Security" is included in the anthology New Daughters of Africa (ed. Margaret Busby, 2019).

Edwards was elected a Fellow of the Royal Society of Literature in November 2020.

Bibliography
 A Cupboard Full of Coats, UK: Oneworld Publications, 2011, . 
US: HarperCollins/Amistad, 2016, 
 The Mother, UK: Pan Macmillan, 2016, . 
US: HarperCollins/Amistad, 2016,

Awards and nominations
 A Cupboard Full of Coats
 2011: A Kirkus Reviews Best Book of the Year
 2011: Booker Prize for Fiction shortlist 
 2011: Waverton Good Read Award shortlist 
 2011: Writers’ Guild Awards shortlist
 2012: Commonwealth Book Prize shortlist
 2013: 44th NAACP Image Awards nomination
 2013: International Dublin Literary Award nomination
 The Mother
 2016: 48th NAACP Image Awards nomination
 2017: Hurston-Wright Legacy Award nomination

References

External links
 Official website.
 Yvvette Edwards page, Eve White Literary Agent.
 Norwich Showcase, "Yvvette Edwards reads at Norwich Showcase '12". NCWonline, 20 March 2012.  
 "Yvvette Edwards discusses A Cupboard Full of Coats", Oneworld Publications. 16 September 2011.
 Sally Campbell, "Q & A: Yvvette Edwards", Waterstones blog, 10 April 2016.
 "A Conversation...", Greenacre Writers, 8 June 2016.
 Donna Bailey Nurse, "Yvvette Edwards On The Mother", Blackiris, 15 July 2017.

Living people
21st-century British novelists
21st-century British women writers
Writers from London
Black British women writers
English people of Montserratian descent
Year of birth missing (living people)
British women novelists
Fellows of the Royal Society of Literature